

Political Affiliation
DTA - Democratic Turnhalle Alliance

See also
Namibia
Bantustans in South West Africa
Apartheid
Presidents of Namibia
Prime Ministers of Namibia

External links
World Statesmen – Namibia Homelands

Apartheid in South West Africa
Bantustans in South West Africa